A known error is a software bug that has not been fixed, but has a known root cause and either has little disruptive impact on the end user or a known work around.

Tested systems are often described as "free from known errors" in recognition that complex systems cannot be proven to be error free.

In IT Operations known errors may be logged in a system's known error database (KEDB) which is then used to prioritize changes and to develop customer support reference information where a work around exists. In the ITIL framework KEDB is a part of the Problem Management process.

See also 
Fatal system error

References 

Computer errors